is a 3-D cel-shaded fighting game developed by Eighting and published by D3 Publisher and Tomy. It is based on the popular anime and manga series Naruto by Masashi Kishimoto, and the first installment of the Naruto: Clash of Ninja video game series. In the game, players pit two characters from the Naruto manga and anime series against each other, using basic attacks and special techniques to defeat their opponent in one of the game's modes.

Clash of Ninja was originally released in Japan on April 11, 2003, and the game was subsequently released in North America on March 7, 2006, with the only major difference being the voice-overs by the English voice actors from the Naruto anime. Critical opinions of the game have been mixed, with many praising the simple and easy-to-learn fighting system, with others lambasting the fighting system, and the lack of significant unlockable content.

Gameplay

Over the course of the game, the player controls one of a select few characters directly based upon their counterparts in the Naruto anime and manga. Clash of Ninja is a member of the fighting game genre; the player pits their character against another character controlled by the game's AI or by another player, depending on the mode that the player is in. The objective is to reduce the opponent's health to zero using basic attacks and special techniques unique to each character that are derived from techniques they use in the Naruto anime or manga. For instance, Naruto Uzumaki is able to use his signature , and Rock Lee utilizes many of his Strong Fist style techniques. To use these techniques, characters have available a chakra bar, which depletes upon the execution of a special technique, and regenerates over time. In the game's numerous modes, the player can choose from different styles of play. The game's story mode follows the plot from the anime and manga, and a versus mode pitting two players against each other also included.

Development
The original Japanese version of Clash of Ninja, the first installment of the Clash of Ninja series, was developed by Eighting and published by D3 Publisher and Tomy, and released on April 11, 2003. On October 27, 2005, both Clash of Ninja and its sequel, Clash of Ninja 2, were confirmed for a 2006 release in North America. The game has a total of ten characters that come from the Land of Waves  arc of the series (covers the events up to episode 19 in the anime). Masato Toyoshima, one of the executives of Eighting, stated that the game was designed to appeal to both casual and hardcore gamers. The only significant difference made by Eighting in the development between the English variant and its Japanese counterpart were the voice-overs, which were done by the English voice actors in the Naruto anime. Toyoshima claimed that the development team was especially "proud that [they] were able to accomplish" creating the cel-shaded graphics that closely matched the scenes in the Naruto anime and manga.

Reception

Clash of Ninja has received mixed reactions from several video game publications. GameRankings gave it a score of 67.35%, while Metacritic gave it 72 out of 100. In Japan, Famitsu gave the game a score of 31 out of 40. The game sold well in North America, becoming part of Nintendo's set of Player's Choice games, which lowers the retail price to $19.99 if the game has sold at least 250,000 copies.

The gameplay present in the game was subject to mixed opinions amongst critics. IGN lauded the game's battle system as "very balanced, amazingly quick, and still a lot of fun," but accepted that the battle designs were "a bit basic." GameSpot provided a more negative review, deriding the game's different modes as "seriously boring and predictable," as well as criticizing the lack of significant differences in the playing style of the game's characters. GameSpot characterized the voice acting as having "some of the worst stereotypes of anime voice acting," and noted the lack of unlockable items and other incentives to continue play. G4's X-Play gave Clash of Ninja two out of five stars, lambasting the fighting engine as "one of the laziest, most oversimplified engines ever seen in a 3D fighting game," and "ridiculously basic." X-Play also criticized the lack of a significant plot in the story mode and the lack of use of cutscenes or unlockable items. GameSpy commented on this, noting that "considering the charm of the source material, [the game] is really a disappointment".

The cel-shaded graphics and audio received acclaim from reviewers, with GameSpot praising the game's "smooth, powerful-looking animations," as well as extolling how "powerful sound effects and a driving soundtrack" contributed to the game's overall feel. GameSpy noted that "[the game] manages to shine in the visual department," making note of how the varied graphical details were "fluid and precise and doesn't ever slow down or become choppy." X-Play, however, considered the graphics "underwhelming," criticizing the lack of significant usage of animation and cinematic scenes, and remarking that the graphics "follow the rest of the game's lead."

See also

 Naruto: Clash of Ninja (series)
 List of Naruto video games

References

External links
 Official D3 Publisher site 
 Official D3 Publisher site 
 Official Eighting site 

2003 video games
3D fighting games
Eighting games
Tomy games
Video games with cel-shaded animation
GameCube games
GameCube-only games
Clash of Ninja
Video games developed in Japan
Video games scored by Shinji Hosoe
Video games scored by Yousuke Yasui
Multiplayer and single-player video games

it:Naruto: Clash of Ninja